Dawson Dunbar (born July 14, 1999 in Calgary, Alberta) is a Canadian actor.

Dawson won Best Performance in a Short Film at the 32nd Young Artist Awards for Little Big Kid. He was also nominated at the 31st Young Artist Awards in the same category for his performance in Trolls. In 2012, Dawson won Best Performance in a Short Film for Bred in Captivity at the 33rd Young Artist Awards

He has an older brother called Talon Dunbar, who is also an actor.

Dawson is best known for his performance in the movie Furious 7 where he played a younger version of Paul Walker. He has previously mentioned that the filming process had him miss weeks of high school.

He has frequently collaborated with YouTube streamer Dr DisRespect.

He is also great friends with Matthew Zegar.

Filmography

Awards

References

External links

1999 births
Canadian male child actors
Canadian male television actors
Living people
Male actors from Calgary
21st-century Canadian male actors